Crystal (also spelt Chrystall) is a surname. Notable people with the surname include:

 Ben Crystal (born 1977), British actor, writer and producer
 Billy Crystal (born 1948), American comedian and actor
 David Crystal (born 1941), British linguist and author
Lillian Chrystall (born 1926), New Zealand architect
 Ralph Crystal, American psychologist, professor, and author